Perfect Witness is a 1989 American made-for-television thriller film directed by Robert Mandel and written by Terry Curtis Fox and Ron Hutchinson. The film stars Brian Dennehy, Aidan Quinn, Stockard Channing, Laura Harrington, Delroy Lindo and Joe Grifasi. The film premiered on HBO on October 28, 1989.

Plot
A witness to a mob killing has second thoughts about testifying when he realizes his family might become a target.

Cast 
Brian Dennehy as James Falcon
Aidan Quinn as Sam Paxton
Stockard Channing as Liz Sapperstein
Laura Harrington as Jeanie Paxton
Delroy Lindo as Berger
Joe Grifasi as Breeze
Ken Pogue as Costello
Markus Flanagan as Woods
David Margulies as Rudnick
Nial Lancaster as Danny Paxton
James Greene as Paddy O'Rourke
Colm Meaney as Meagher
Tobin Bell as Dillon
Tony Sirico as Marco
Sam Malkin as Stefano
Kevin Rushton as Rikky
David Cumming as Kevin O'Rourke
David Proval as Lucca
Christopher Trace as Eddie Wallis
David Christopher Adamson as Newton 
Jennifer Pearson as Jeanie's Sister

References

External links
 

1989 television films
1989 films
1980s English-language films
1989 thriller films
HBO Films films
Films directed by Robert Mandel
Films scored by Brad Fiedel
American thriller television films
1980s American films